A tangelo is a type of citrus fruit.

Tangelo may also refer to:
Tangelo (color), a shade of orange
Tangelo Park, a census-designated place in Florida

See also
Tangerine (disambiguation)